Colin Kerr Donnelly (born 5 September 1959) is a Scottish runner who was the British fell running champion three times and finished second in the World Mountain Running Trophy.

Early life
Donnelly is a son of Raymond Donnelly, a sometime racing cyclist. Colin attended Eastwood High School, Newton Mearns and was a member of the Cambuslang Harriers. He showed some talent as a youngster, winning the Galloway and Renfrewshire Schools under-19s cross country championships. His first hill race was at Ben Lomond in 1978. The following year, he won the Ben Nevis Race and in 1980 finished a close second in the Three Peaks Race. He graduated in Arts from the University of Aberdeen.

Running career
The peak of Donnelly's running career was in the late 1980s. In 1986 he had another victory at Ben Nevis in one of the fastest times ever recorded for the race. He won the British Fell Running Championships three consecutive times from 1987 to 1989 and in 1988, he won the Snowdon Race.

Also in 1988, he set a record for the traverse of the Welsh 3000s with a time of 4:19 which stood until 2019 when it was beaten by Finlay Wild. Donnelly has also won the Welsh 1000 m Peaks Race many times.

Donnelly finished second in the short race at the World Mountain Running Trophy in 1989. As a veteran, he won global titles at the World Masters Mountain Running Championships in the over-40 category in 2001 and as an over-60 runner in 2019.

He held the course record for the Buckden Pike Race from 1988 to 2022, and still holds the Shelf Moor Race record, set in 1989. He continued to win races as late as 2017, thirty-eight years after his first Ben Nevis win.

He has completed the Bob Graham, Paddy Buckley and Ramsay Rounds, as well as the South Wales 2,000ers.

References

External links
 Calum Muskett on Vimeo: Colin Donnelly – Welsh 3000ers record (not filmed during the record run itself but on the route the following year).

1959 births
Living people
People educated at Eastwood High School, Newton Mearns
Alumni of the University of Aberdeen
British fell runners
British male mountain runners
Scottish male long-distance runners
Place of birth missing (living people)
Sportspeople from East Renfrewshire